Gullholmen Lighthouse is a coastal lighthouse in the municipality of Moss in Viken, Norway. The lighthouse is located in the outer Oslofjord, off the island Jeløya. It was established in 1894, and replaced by a light in 1984.

See also

 List of lighthouses in Norway
 Lighthouses in Norway

References

External links
 Norsk Fyrhistorisk Forening 

Lighthouses completed in 1894
Lighthouses in Viken